Thunive Thunai is a 1976 Indian Tamil-language action-thriller film, directed by S. P. Muthuraman and written by Panchu Arunachalam. The film stars Jaishankar, Jayaprabha and Rajasulochana, with S. A. Ashokan, Suruli Rajan and S. V. Ramadas in supporting roles. It was a box office hit.

Plot 
The Movie starts with the police asking help from CID officer Vijaykumar(Vijaykumar) to visit Ponvayal village, to investigate a mystery happening around the village. During his train journey, a stranger boards the train and warns him to go back since the village ponvayal is dangerous and anyone apart from the villagers who go there will face the wrath of the village goddess. The stranger fights with him and jumps from the train.

Upon arrival, he visits the station master room in which an old man who wears the station master uniform welcomes him and repeat the same dialogue said by the stranger. And he tells a story about his late son (who is the stranger), how he died during a train journey placing a bet and that he roams the place as a ghost as said by people of the village. Hearing this story Vijaykumar is terrified and hurries off, when he come across another station master he enquires about the old station master to him, who says the old master is dead and heard the people say his ghost roams here since he died by suicide in that room, he gets scared.

Even though horrified Vijaykumar sets to the village in a bullock cart, when a woman in white saree crosses them singing a song "aagayathil thotil ketti"he tries to follow the women, but she disappears mysteriously. whilereturning he finds the bullock cart driver lying dead on the ground, seeing that he gets petrified and dies of shock. Hearing the death news of his brother vijaykumar, Anandh also a fellow CBI officer decides to visit the village himself, since he is doubtful that there's uncertainty in his brother's death . The same events follow during Anandh arrival . He avoids all the attempt to scare him smartly, being cautious.

Finally when he arrives to the village some goons try to scare him off, which he doesn't mind and carries off. Hungry he visits a restaurant, where they refuse to serve him food instead insults him and sends him back. No shop owner gives him anything, even the kids doesn't give him water for thirst. At the verge of hunger he begs the goons, but they don't mind his pleas, a girl Prabha (Jayaprabha) daughter of the village head Singaram gives him food.

At night Anandh visits prabha and seek her help for building a tent. All the attempts of the goons trying to scare him fails. Anandh tries hard and gain help from one of the henchman Babu (Suruli Rajan) from the goons gang. Through the help of him he escapes from the near death attempt made on him by the goons, after he learns the gang does illegal business by selling Statues of god. Everyone believes he is dead. Taking advantage of this he arrives to the village as Dhayal, an international gangster and announces the goons, that he came in search of Anandh to avenge him for his arrest. The goons tell him he is dead, but dhayal refuses to believe and ask them to show his dead body . Seeing the body missing the goons believe he has escaped. Before the whole village he stages a drama that he and Anandh are two different people and kills him. Later it is revealed that the one acted as anandh is his fellow officer helping him.

Seeing Dhayal killing a CBI officer, the gang inspired by his boldness take him to their cave where they introduce him to their leader (Raja Sulochana) whom they address as thalaivi. She keeps some tests to check his originality, in which he succeeds.

After some turn of events Dhayal gets married to Prabha to which she opposes first but later gets happy, learning he is Anandh imposing as Dhayal . Seeing her sudden change in accepting Dhayal, Thalaivi is impressed by Dhayal falls for him and tries to woo him. Later that night, Anandh informs the police about the illegal activities done by the gang and asks them to arrive immediately.

However, the Thalaivi finds out that he is not original Dhayal and imprisons Anandh, Prabha, Babu and fleas the village along with all the people from the village. Anandh escapes and with the help of some people chase the whole gang.

The movie ends with the arrest of the whole gang by Anandh with the help of police.

Cast 
 Jaishankar as CID Anand and Dhayal
 Jayaprabha as Prabha (debut)
 Vijayakumar as CID Vijaykumar
 Rajasulochana as Madam, Smuggler's Head
 S. A. Ashokan as Coffin Maker, Madam's Henchman
 S. V. Ramadoss as Hotel Manager, Madam's Henchman
 K. Kannan as Coffin Maker's Younger Brother, Madam's Henchman
Senthamarai as landlord Singaram, Madam's Henchman
 Suruli Rajan as Babu
 Vennira Aadai Moorthy as Forest Ranger, Madam's Henchman
 Aparna as Radha
 Kallapart Natarajan as Smuggler, Madam's Henchman
Pakoda Kadhar as Villager
Peeli Sivam as Station Master
 P. S. Venkatachalam as Old Man

Production

For the climax scene involving helicopter chase, the crew had bought helicopter used for spraying pesticides from Southern Aviation Corporation. The scene which was shot in Kovalam Beach and near Mamallapuram took two days to be completed.

Soundtrack 
Soundtrack was composed by M. S. Viswanathan and lyrics were by Kannadasan.

Reception
Kanthan of Kalki praised the performance of Jaishankar, Babu's cinematography and added although there are many incidents that happen as told, the film is enjoyable to watch and called it a boldly made film.

References

External links 
 

1970s action thriller films
1970s spy thriller films
1970s Tamil-language films
Films about mining
Films about organised crime in India
Films directed by S. P. Muthuraman
Films scored by M. S. Viswanathan
Films with screenplays by Panchu Arunachalam
Indian action thriller films
Indian spy thriller films